My People, My Country is a 2019 Chinese anthology drama film, consisting of seven segments directed by seven directors, Chen Kaige, Zhang Yibai, Guan Hu, Xue Xiaolu, Xu Zheng, Ning Hao, and Wen Muye. It stars many of China's top actors, many in supporting roles and cameos. My People, My Country is produced jointly by Huaxia Film Distribution, Polybona Films and Alibaba Pictures. The film was released in China on September 30, 2019, to commemorate the 70th anniversary of the establishment of the People's Republic of China. It has two sequels, My People, My Homeland (2020) and My Country, My Parents (2021).

Plot

The Eve 
The opening segment by director Guan Hu, The Eve, is about an engineer, Lin Zhiyuan (played by Huang Bo), racing against time to perfect an automatic flag-raising mechanism before the founding ceremony of the People's Republic of China on October 1, 1949.

Passing by 

The Champion 
The third story The Champion, directed by Xu Zheng, is about how a young boy from Shanghai named Dong Dong (played by Han Haolin) helped his neighbors watch TV for the China women's national volleyball team's Olympic gold medal win in 1984.

Going Home 
The fourth story Going Home, directed by Xue Xiaolu, is about a Chinese executive delegation and local policemen preparing for the return of Hong Kong from British rule to China in 1997. The 12-second silence between the British and Chinese anthems during the Hong Kong handover ceremony is also reflected in this part.

Hello Beijing 
The fifth story Hello Beijing, directed by Ning Hao, is about a taxi driver who gives a ticket to the opening ceremony of the 2008 Beijing Olympics to a boy from the Sichuan earthquake zone though it was intended to be a birthday gift to his aloof son.

The Guiding Star 
The sixth story The Guiding Star, directed by Chen Kaige, is about a pair of homeless brothers who witness the landing of the capsule of the Shenzhou 11 crewed spacecraft on November 18, 2016, a moment of national pride that touched them.

One for All 
One for All, directed by Wen Muye, follows the story of a top female fighter jet pilot Lü Xiaoran who helps her fellow pilots accomplish a smooth aerial performance at the Military Parade of the 70th Anniversary of the Victory in the Second Sino-Japanese War in 1945.

Cast

 The Eve (directed by Guan Hu)
 Huang Bo as Lin Zhiyuan
 Oho Ou
 Wang Qianyuan
 Liang Jing
 Jiang Wu
 Hu Jun
 Tong Dawei
 Vision Wei
 Xin Baiqing
 Geng Le 
 Wang Tianchen

 Passing by (directed by Zhang Yibai)

 Zhang Yi as Gao Yuan
 Ren Suxi as Fang Min
 Zhang Jiayi as Group Leader
 Zhou Dongyu as Nurse
 Peng Yuchang
 Luo Haiqiong
 Guo Cheng
 Zhou Yiran

 The Champion (directed by Xu Zheng)
 Wu Jing as Xu Dongdong (adult)
 Ma Yili as Zhao Qimei (adult)
 Han Haolin as Xu Dongdong (child)
 Fan Yujie as Zhao Qimei (child)
 Liu Tao as Mei's mother
 Xu Zheng as television anchor
 Wang Zhifei
 Shao Wen
 Zhang Zhihua
 Duan Bowen as Table Tennis Coach

 Going Home (directed by Xue Xiaolu)
 Du Jiang as Zhu Tao
 Zhu Yilong as Song Yueqiang
 Wang Daotie as Wang Yinghui
 Wang Luoyong as An Wenbin
 Kara Wai as Lin
 Simon Yam as Wah
 Gao Yalin as Cheng Zhiqiang
 Gregory Charles Rivers
 Natasha Dratinskaia Christiansen as Maureen
 Kwok Keung Cheung

 Hello Beijing (directed by Ning Hao)
 Ge You as Zhang Beijing
 Cheng Yusen as Zhang Xiaojing
 Gong Beibi as Yuan Rong
 Wang Dong as Boy from Wenchuan
 Ma Shuliang as Taxi Company Leader

 The Guiding Star (directed by Chen Kaige)
 Liu Haoran
 Arthur Chen
 Tian Zhuangzhuang
 Jiang Shan
 Jing Haipeng
 Chen Dong

 One for All (directed by Wen Muye)
 Song Jia
 Tong Liya
 Elvis Han
 Lei Jiayin
 Zhang Zifeng
 Wang Yanhui
 Tao Hong 
 Guo Jingfei
 Yuan Wenkang

Music

Release
On March 20, 2019, the producers announced that the film was slated for release on October 1, 2019, during the National Day. On September 6, 2019, it was announced that the film has been advanced to September 30, 2019.

My People, My Country was distributed by China Media Capital, a major international distributor of Chinese film and television, in the United States, Canada, Australia and New Zealand.

Reception

Box office
With a total gross of over $425 million, My People, My Country currently sits as the 12th highest-grossing non-English film of all time. The film grossed about 369 million yuan (51.62 million U.S. dollars) on its second day of screening. It grossed one billion yuan in three days.
The film earned more than 2 billion yuan on its opening weekend.

Critical response
Douban, a major Chinese media rating site, gave the drama 8.1 out of 10.

References

External links
 
 
 
 Plots of My People, My Country on china.org.cn

2019 films
2010s Mandarin-language films
Chinese drama films
Chinese anthology films
IMAX films
Films directed by Chen Kaige
Films set in Beijing
Films set in Shanghai
Films set in Inner Mongolia
Films set in Hong Kong
Films shot in Hong Kong
Films shot in Beijing
Films shot in Shanghai
Films shot in Inner Mongolia
Films directed by Xu Zheng
Films directed by Guan Hu